The South West African Police (SWAPOL) was the national police force of South West Africa (now Namibia), responsible for law enforcement and public safety in South West Africa when the territory was administered by South Africa. It was organised and structured both as a paramilitary force and as a civil police force.

History

SWAPOL was established following World War I, when the South African government assumed administration of South West Africa under the terms of a League of Nations mandate. Between 1915 and 1919, public security and law enforcement were entrusted to the South African military police. On December 31, 1939, the rule of law returned to South West Africa when SWAPOL was founded as the territory's first civilian law enforcement agency. An investigation department was established in 1920. SWAPOL was disbanded in 1939, and its local units absorbed into the South African Police (SAP).

The SAP responsible for the territory from 1939 to 1981. Until 1981 it was a Provincial Police Region of the SAP, headed by a police lieutenant general. A third of all the policemen in the district were SAP transferrals from South Africa, with the remaining two-thirds being personnel recruited locally. The League of Nations mandate was terminated by the United Nations in 1966, with South Africa from then on illegally occupying South West Africa. SWAPOL was re-established in 1981, after the territory had become self-governing.

Role in Counterinsurgency

The first large scale contact between units of the SWAPOL and the People's Liberation Army of Namibia was in 1968. On July 14, 1968, a Police Patrolling team from Eenhana District Police, led by Sergeant Fourie, W/O Nelumbu, B/Constable Bavingi, Constable Schaefer, Constable Hattingh and B/Constable Kauluma were patrolling the Eenhana-Outapi Highway when their Land Rover jeep came under machine gun fire and grenade attack from a band of guerillas from the bushes. Their jeep tyres having been shot away, Sgt. Fourie and W/O Nelumbu fired back with their side arms (pistols) and a wounded Constable Hattingh brought to bear the lone Sten Gun in the jeep to drive the attack away, in the process rescuing under fire a wounded B/Constable Kauluma, the driver, who had been thrown from the jeep and wounded. Following this attack Police radio patrols in the highway region were strengthened with an additional jeep with 2 Policemen armed with the R1 rifle (A variant of the FN FAL manufactured in South Africa). In 1970 the situation had deteriorated to the extent that all Policemen in the Northern Region were given training in the R1 and the Sten Gun, and the SWAPOL Airwing started twice daily helicopter patrols along the Eenhana-Outapi Road

Until 1970, the arms sanctioned for SWAPOL units were as following - for Police Stations - 25 Batons, 8 Pistols, 3 Sten Guns, 12 Lee Enfield .303 Rifles, and 1 Bren light machine gun. For District Police Reserve Forces - 150 Batons and Shields, 20 Tear Gas Guns, 30 Pistols, 18 Sten Guns, 10 R1 Rifles (introduced from December 1969) 36 Lee Enfield .303 Rifles, 20 Shotguns, and 4 Bren light machine guns. For Mobile Patrol/Flying Squad team - 2 Pistols, 1 Sten Gun, 2 R1 Rifles.

Between 1974 and 1977, all Sten Guns and .303 Rifles were phased out and replaced with R1 Rifles. 4 M2 Browning heavy machine guns, 2 of them mounted on mobile patrol, were also assigned to the District Police Reserve from 1974 onwards, and 1 M2 Browning assigned to each Police Station. From 1978 onwards, 2 105mm Recoilless Rifles were assigned to each Police Circle Reserve. Casspirs were provided at the level of District Reserve from 1982 onwards and at Police Stations from 1984 onwards.

Organization
Until 1981, the organization of the SWAPOL was as follows:
 Police Stations (divided into several Outposts, Beats and Mobile Patrols/Flying Squad) led by a Lieutenant or an Inspector, 
 District Police/Investigation Centres (controlling around 4 Police Stations and having an Armed Reserve) commanded by a Major, 
 Police Circles (controlling 3 Districts) led by a Colonel, 
 Regional Police Commands (controlling 2 to 3 Circles or an entire Bantustan) commanded by a Brigadier, and 
 four Super-Commands of North, South, Coastal and Koevoet, commanded by Major Generals. 
 The Cities of Walvis Bay and Windhoek were at the level of Super-Command,
 The Air Wing was at the level of a Regional Police Command. The Air Wing maintained a Central Fleet of 20 helicopters and a further fleet of 6 helicopters under each of the Regional Commands. 
 There were other functional and Staff Directorates led by Brigadiers, such as Criminal Investigation, Forensics, Administration, Intelligence, Training, Communications/Wireless, Economic Offences, Personnel, Traffic, Provisioning, and Establishment

Koevoet 

SWAPOL's most controversial unit was its counter-insurgency division, which was known officially as SWAPOL-COIN or Operation K, but more commonly referred to as Koevoet. Koevoet was initially an autonomous unit under the nominal authority of the SAP Security Branch, but became part of SWAPOL in 1985. Koevoet worked closely with SWAPOL's own Security Branch in investigating crimes of a political nature, namely politically motivated murders. The unit was better known for its combat operations against insurgents of the People's Liberation Army of Namibia (PLAN) in Ovamboland, which earned it a formidable reputation. Koevoet's hybrid status as a paramilitary police unit made it something of a legal anomaly; for example, it lacked the mandate to hold insurgents as prisoners of war. Insurgents were technically supposed to be apprehended for trial in open courts as common law criminals. Based on this interpretation, the South West African courts ruled that insurgents captured by Koevoet had to be granted legal representation and could not be detained indefinitely.

With the South African Border War drawing to a close in mid-1989, Koevoet was greatly reduced in size and most of its personnel were reassigned to other divisions by SWAPOL. Additionally, many of the South African personnel were transferred back to the South African Police or the Homeland Forces. In 1988, SWAPOL consisted of 6,500 uniformed personnel, including the 3000-man Koevoet force and the 300-man Air Wing, of which 4000 were local Blacks, 800 were local Whites, 1000 were South African Whites and 700 were South African Blacks. The local Municipal Constabulary, Homeland Guards and Traffic Police were entirely locals, both Black and White Nevertheless, the unit's continued existence was the subject of much controversy, as both current and former Koevoet operators were accused of political intimidation and human rights abuses. United Nations Security Council Resolution 640 explicitly named Koevoet as being a barrier to the peace process in Namibia and demanded its disbandment. SWAPOL dissolved the unit on October 30, 1989.

References

History of Namibia
Law enforcement in Namibia
Organisations associated with apartheid
Apartheid in South West Africa